Czechoslovakia competed at the 1976 Winter Paralympics in Örnsköldsvik, Sweden. The country's delegation consisted of five competitors in two sports: two athletes in alpine skiing, two in cross-country skiing, and one in both.

Medalists

Alpine skiing

Cross-country skiing

See also
Czechoslovakia at the 1976 Winter Olympics

References

Nations at the 1976 Winter Paralympics
1976 Winter
Paralympics